Sorensen Peak is a peak (2,640 m) which rises between the base of Lyttelton Range and Church Ridge in the Admiralty Mountains. It surmounts the divide between the Dennistoun and Leander Glaciers. Mapped by United States Geological Survey (USGS) from surveys and U.S. Navy air photos, 1960–63. Named by Advisory Committee on Antarctic Names (US-ACAN) for Douglas J. Sorensen, field assistant at McMurdo Station, 1965–66.

Mountains of Victoria Land
Borchgrevink Coast